The 1964–65 season was Blackpool F.C.'s 57th season (54th consecutive) in the Football League. They competed in the 22-team Division One, then the top tier of English football, finishing seventeenth.

Ray Charnley was the club's top scorer for the seventh consecutive season, with 22 goals (21 in the league and one in the League Cup).

Table

Notes

References

Blackpool F.C.
Blackpool F.C. seasons